White Butte is the highest natural point in the U.S. state of North Dakota. At an elevation of 3,506 ft (1,069 m), it is a prominent butte in Slope County, in the Badlands of the southwestern part of the state.

The nearest town is Amidon, about seven miles to the northwest. It is on private property, owned by the Dennis family who live nearby. At the parking area, one mile due north of the trailhead, the family maintains a small mailbox-like receptacle for donations to help maintain the area, and requests a $5 contribution from visitors. From the trailhead, the trail itself is a 4-mile round trip.

See also
Outline of North Dakota
Index of North Dakota-related articles
List of U.S. states by elevation

References

External links
 
 
 

Buttes of North Dakota
Landforms of Slope County, North Dakota
Highest points of U.S. states
Tourist attractions in Slope County, North Dakota
North American 1000 m summits